San Cristoforo is a 12th-century Roman Catholic church in Terni, region of Umbria, in Italy. Francis of Assisi is putatively said to have preached from atop a stone at the right flank of the church, now housing a bronze sculpture of the saint.

History
The small simple church is made from stone bricks, likely spolia, and has a single nave with fragments remaining of 14th and 15th century frescoes. There is also a triptych with St Christopher, while a 17th-century canvas depicting the church's patron in housed in the adjacent modern church building.

References

12th-century Roman Catholic church buildings in Italy
Churches in Terni